Cantine is a surname. Notable people with the surname include:

David Cantine (born 1939), Canadian painter
James Cantine (1861–1940), American missionary, scholar, and traveler
John Cantine (1735–1808), American politician
Moses I. Cantine (1774–1823), American politician, judge, and newspaper editor